Paradise, is the fifth studio album by Singaporean duo, By2. It was released on September 18, 2013, with a total of 10 tracks with 4 promotional singles. The album achieved immediate success shortly after its release.

Background and release
Prior to the release of the album, the title track, No Reason (沒理由) was released first on September 5, 2013 and the music video for the song was also uploaded on Ocean Butterflies's official YouTube channel. The album was released in 3 editions; the Regular edition, the Devil edition and the Angel edition, with the Devil and Angel editions being pre-order editions only.  Following the release of the album, the music video of their second promotional single, No More Tears (不哭了), was released on September 18, 2013. The music videos for the other four promotional singles were also released on YouTube through the label's official channel.

By2 held various meet and greet sessions around Taiwan and China and also performed on various Taiwanese variety shows to promote the album.

Commercial performance
The album peaked at number 6 on Taiwan's G-Music chart during the week from September 14 to 20.

Composition
The studio album contains 10 tracks, including the title track, No Reason (沒理由). The title track which is a dance pop track that garners influences from America’s house-pop style, a genre of electronic dance music. With the lyrics by Lin Tsu Chin, the song also has an English version titled Stereo. The second promotional track, Didn't Cry (不哭了), is a ballad track with lyrics about the imperfection of a relationship.

Track listing

References

External links
By2 Official Facebook
 
 
 
 

2013 albums
Chinese-language albums
By2 albums